The Europe/Africa Zone was one of the three zones of regional Davis Cup competition in 2011.

In the Europe/Africa Zone there were three different groups in which teams competed against each other to advance to the next group.

The Division III tournament was held in the Week commencing 4 July 2011 at the Smash Tennis Academy, Cairo, Egypt playing on outdoor clay courts.

Participating teams

Format
It was held on 4–9 July 2011 at the Smash Tennis Academy in Cairo, Egypt on outdoor clay courts.

The ten nations were split into two pools and played in a round robin format. The group winners played one playoff game against each other to decide which team will be promoted.

Group stage

Group A
Rwanda withdrew from the competition and a walkover was given to their opponents in Group A.

Madagascar vs. Benin

Egypt vs. Benin

Egypt vs. Nigeria

Madagascar vs. Nigeria

Egypt vs. Madagascar

Benin vs. Nigeria

Group B

Algeria vs. Kenya

Zimbabwe vs. Cote d'Ivoire

Algeria vs. Cote d'Ivoire

Ghana vs. Kenya

Algeria vs. Ghana

Zimbabwe vs. Kenya

Zimbabwe vs. Ghana

Cote d'Ivoire vs. Kenya

Algeria vs. Zimbabwe

Ghana vs. Cote d'Ivoire

Playoffs

1st to 4th Playoff

Zimbabwe vs. Egypt

Madagascar vs. Algeria

5th to 6th Playoff

Ghana vs. Benin

7th to 8th Playoff

Nigeria vs. Cote d'Ivoire

9th to 10th play-off

Rwanda vs. Kenya
This match was scratched and Kenya were awarded ninth place as Rwanda withdrew from the tournament.

References

External links
Davis Cup draw details

Africa Zone Group III
Davis Cup Europe/Africa Zone